The 12875 / 12876 Neelachal Express is a tri-weekly train which runs between  in Odisha and Anand Vihar Terminal railway station. It is one of the oldest train that connects Puri to Anand Vihar Terminal. The main towns along the route are Bhubaneshwar, Cuttack, Bhadrak, Balasore, Hijili, Tatanagar, Bokaro Steel City, Muri, Gaya, Mughalsarai, Varanasi, Bhadohi, Rae Bareli, Lucknow, Kanpur. Neelachal Express consist of 1 AC First Class coach, 2 Second AC coach, 6 Third AC coaches, 7 Sleeper Class coaches, 2 General (Un-Reserved) coaches, 1 Pantry Car, 1 Divyangjan Coach and 1 EOG.

Coach Composition

The 12875/ 12876 Puri–Anand Vihar Terminal Neelachal Express presently has 1 AC First Class, 2 AC 2 tier, 6 AC 3 tier, 7 Sleeper Class, 2 Second Class seating, 1 Divyangjan Coach & 1 EOG coach. Also, it does have a pantry car.

As with most train services in India, coach composition may be amended at the discretion of Indian Railways depending on demand.

Service

12875 Puri–Anand Vihar Terminal Neelachal Express covers the distance of 1914 kilometers in 24 hours 50 mins (57.20 km/hr) & in 24 hours 25 mins as 12876 Anand Vihar Terminal–Puri Neelachal Express (59.48 km/hr).

Neelachal Express was moved from New Delhi to Anand Vihar Terminal in May 2018.

Timetable
From Puri to Anand Vihar Terminal - 12875. The train starts from Puri every Sunday, Tuesday & Friday.

From Anand Vihar Terminal to Puri – 12876. The train starts from Anand Vihar Terminal every Sunday, Tuesday & Friday.

Background
This train is given name on The abode of Hindu deity Jagannath at Puri is known as the Nilachal or Niladri, [Nila (Blue) + Achal (Mountain)] meaning, The Blue Mountain. The Nilachal is a place of high religious significance in Hinduism and is one of the four Char Dhams. Religious teachers like Shri Ramanuja Acharya, Swami Vishnuswami visited Nilachal in the Twelfth century and established a mathas. Shri Nimbarka Acharya also visited Puri, as also Guru Nanak Dev and many other Acharyas. Shri Chaitanya spent 18 years at Nilachal dhama.

Coach composition

The train has Mordern LHB rakes with max speed of 130 kmph.

 1 AC First Class
 2 AC II Tier
 6 AC III Tier
 1 Pantry Car
 7 Sleeper Coaches
 2 General
 1 Divyanjan cum Guard Coach
 1 EOG

Route & Halts

As the route is fully electrified, Ghaziabad-based WAP-7 locomotive powers the train from Puri to Anand Vihar Terminal.

References

External links
 12875 Neelachal Express at India Rail Info
 12876 Neelachal Express at India Rail Info

Transport in Puri
Transport in Delhi
Named passenger trains of India
Rail transport in Uttar Pradesh
Rail transport in Odisha
Express trains in India
Rail transport in West Bengal
Rail transport in Jharkhand
Rail transport in Bihar
Rail transport in Delhi